Inverness Rowing Club is a rowing club on the Caledonian Canal next to the River Ness based at Torvean, Inverness, Scottish Highlands. The club is affiliated to Scottish Rowing.

History
The club is due to undergo significant development over the next five years which includes a new boathouse.

The club has produced several national champions.

Notable members
 Alan Sinclair

Honours

National champions

References

Sport in Inverness
Rowing clubs in Scotland